Alex Kuznetsov was the defender of championship title, but he lost to Michael Russell in the first round.  Brian Dabul defeated Tim Smyczek 6–1, 1–6, 6–1 in the final.

Seeds

Draw

Finals

Top half

Bottom half

References
Main Draw
Qualifying Singles

Nielsen Pro Tennis Championship - Singles
2010 Singles